Nationwide Rip Ridaz is the debut album by the American rap group Nationwide Rip Ridaz released in 1995.

Track listing 
 "Throw the C's in the Air"
 "Nationwide Rip Ridaz"
 "Swervin' Thru the Eastside"
 "What We Celieve in"
 "Crip Keeper"
 "Everything Gonna C Alright"
 "Break-A-Slob-Down"
 "Skits"
 "Slobs Keep on Slippin'" (Remix)
 "Niggaz Don't Want No Problems"
 "Little Blue Devil"
 "Compton Nut"
 "Atlantic Drive Hoo Ride"
 "Sess In the Day Time, Chronic at Night"
 "Roll Call"
 "Bullets Don't Have No Names"

1995 debut albums
Nationwide Rip Ridaz albums
G-funk albums